The men's pole vault event at the 2017 Summer Universiade was held on 25 and 27 August at the Taipei Stadium.

Medalists

Results

Qualification 
Qualification: 5.30 m (Q) or at least 12 best (q) qualified for the final.

Final 

Notes
r: retired

References 

Pole
2017